Andrew Edmiston Jr. (November 13, 1892– August 28, 1966) was a Democratic politician who served as a United States representative from West Virginia. He was born in Weston in Lewis County, West Virginia on November 13, 1892. He served in the Seventy-third through Seventy-seventh Congresses.

He attended the Friends' Select School in Washington, D.C., Kentucky Military Institute at Lyndon, and West Virginia University at Morgantown, West Virginia. He was engaged in agricultural pursuits from 1915 to 1917 and in the manufacture of glass at Weston, West Virginia, starting in 1925. He served overseas in World War I as a second lieutenant with the Thirty-ninth Infantry, Fourth Division from 1917 to 1919. He was awarded the Distinguished Service Cross, the Purple Heart with Oak Leaf Cluster, and the Distinguished Service Medal of West Virginia.

From 1920 to 1935 he served as editor of the Weston Democrat. He held the office of mayor of Weston from 1924 to 1926 and served as a delegate to the Democratic National Conventions in 1928 and 1952. He was state chairman of the Democratic executive committee from 1928 to 1932. He was elected to fill the vacancy caused by the death of Lynn Hornor. Re-elected to the Seventy-fourth and to three succeeding Congresses, he served from November 28, 1933, to January 3, 1943. His candidacy for re-election in 1942 was unsuccessful. He then returned to his former business pursuits. On June 28, 1943, he was appointed Director of War Manpower for West Virginia and served until his resignation on June 30, 1945, to return to private business. He died in Weston on August 28, 1966, aged 73. He was buried in Machpelah Cemetery.

See also
United States congressional delegations from West Virginia

References

EDMISTON, Andrew, online. September 9, 2007.

1892 births
1966 deaths
20th-century American Episcopalians
Editors of West Virginia newspapers
Mayors of places in West Virginia
People from Weston, West Virginia
Recipients of the Distinguished Service Cross (United States)
Military personnel from West Virginia
United States Army personnel of World War I
Democratic Party members of the United States House of Representatives from West Virginia
20th-century American politicians
Burials in West Virginia